"Chuck Versus the First Bank of Evil" is the seventeenth episode of the fourth season of Chuck. It originally aired on February 28, 2011. Chuck Bartowski encourages Vivian McArthur (Lauren Cohan) to get in touch with her inner villain for a mission; Morgan Grimes' search for a new roommate has unexpected results.

Plot

Main plot
The episode begins immediately after the events of "Chuck Versus the Masquerade", with Vivian McArthur (Lauren Cohan) investigating her father Alexei Volkoff's office at the Volkoff Industries headquarters in Moscow, Russia. After unlocking a secret compartment with the locket her father had given her, Vivian finds a bank account card. The opening of the compartment triggers a silent alarm, and a man (Ray Wise) enters, introducing himself as Riley, her father's lawyer. Riley reads Volkoff's will, revealing that he has given Vivian the entire organization, claiming to have groomed her to become his successor. When Vivian declines her father's legacy, Riley holds her at gunpoint, urging her not to waste the opportunity. She stabs his hand to the desk and smashes a vase across his face before escaping. Later at Castle, General Beckman assigns Chuck Bartowski and Sarah Walker to use Vivian to infiltrate the criminal-funding First Bank of Macau, having learned that Volkoff has left a means for her to enter the bank with the account card.

The bank manager (François Chau) escorts Vivian all the way to the vault. Chuck, disguised as Vivian's bodyguard, is held back at the lobby. Vivian passes a series of tests through lie detectors and even a DNA sample before being able to access her father's deposit. The manager finally gives Vivian her father's safe deposit box, revealing countless newspaper headlines on Vivian's achievements and even photographs of her childhood, shocking Vivian. Meanwhile, Chuck steals a guard's access card, being punched in the stomach in the process, and makes his way through the higher levels of the bank, finding a room storing with high-tech equipment. He flashes on it, learning that they are the servers used to handle all of the bank's fundings, having been stolen from the Chinese Army one year earlier. Chuck is then cornered by two of the bank's security guards just after Vivian leaves the vault. Vivian feigns anger at her bodyguard's betrayal, holding him at gunpoint. The staff simply tells her to handle the situation outside of bank property, and they escort the two back to the lobby, where Sarah is disguised as Vivian's head of security. They then leave and return to Castle, where Chuck tells Vivian that he will arrange for her to meet with her father.

Beckman reveals that the bank has used the servers to become a black market stock exchange, laundering money for criminals, terrorists, and rogue nations. As an account holder, Vivian would be able to enter the bank and manually access the network, giving the government access the priceless intelligence. Beckman agrees to let Vivian see her father in exchange for her help and orders Chuck and Sarah to rob the bank as a diversion.

As Vivian makes a deposit in the upper levels of the bank, Chuck and Sarah enter and tranquilize several guards. The guard assigned to Vivian leaves her to prevent the robbery, allowing her to connect to the bank's network. Suddenly, Riley appears and asks Vivian questions the cause her to question Chuck's sincerity. Although he reveals that Chuck is the one responsible for her father's arrest, Vivian asserts that her father is a criminal. Riley points out Volkoff's love for her, telling her that the CIA has manipulated her and will not allow her to see her father. Riley gives her his business card and tells her to tell him when she is ready to claim the company, returning her locket before leaving the bank. Vivian reunites with Chuck and Sarah, and they burn the money they have stolen from the bank.

Beckman later decides that the security risks are too high for Vivian to see her father, and Chuck is forced to apologize to her. Chuck later calls Vivian, who ignores the call and drives away with Riley, wanting to learn the truth about her father.

Sarah
Sarah and Ellie Woodcomb discuss on what types of flowers she should have for the wedding. Sarah confesses that she is not used to the "girl stuff", and asks Ellie to make the decisions for her completely. Ellie, being a good bridesmaid, contacts Sarah to ensure that all of her decisions are to Sarah's liking.

Ellie later calls Sarah with the epiphany that a wedding should be based around the bride's wedding dress, leading Sarah to try on several dresses in the recently expanded Castle "coatroom", which contains dozens of outfits and a holographic representation of the user wearing said outfit. Sarah finds one to her liking and bursts into tears of joy at the realization that she is getting married. Casey compliments the dress, though he points out that the specific one she is wearing has multiple bullet holes on the back and will have to be replaced. Sarah is nonetheless delighted to tell Chuck she picked out her dress, while they rob a bank.

Sarah later makes several expensive demands of Ellie (including 100 dozen Casablanca lilies, a wedding cake flown in from Paris, and reserving a private island for the ceremony), worrying Chuck about the wedding's expenses. Ellie worries that she's created a monster.

Morgan and Casey
Morgan Grimes searches for a new roommate, while temporarily staying at his mother's house. Morgan complains to Big Mike that he is uncomfortable sleeping every night with the "cat noises" (Big Mike and his mother's engaging in intercourse), but Mike simply expresses that Morgan should not be complaining, as he chose to move in with them.

In his office at the Buy More, Morgan searches for a roommate on the internet, only to be interrupted by Jeff Barnes and Lester Patel. Jeff and Lester offer Morgan the empty "room" in their van in exchange for one week off of work to attend a Renaissance fair and meet women, which Morgan swiftly refuses. He then leaves the manager office to handle the store, with the two still in the office. Lester goes onto Morgan's laptop and sabotages his search for a roommate as revenge. While Morgan's prospective roommates arrive, he discovers that they are all participants of the Renaissance fair Jeff and Lester were referring to.

Morgan accepts the room in their van, only to learn that it has since been filled by the fair's "king". As Morgan goes to sleep on the couch in the Buy More home theater room, he is distracted by sounds of construction in Castle. Two men take the secret elevator to install a TR-476 in the facility. Morgan follows the men to Castle, which is being expanded by the National Clandestine Service. Casey confronts Morgan, who claims not to have seen anything.

Morgan apologizes to Casey, who finally agrees to let him stay in the spare room of his apartment. In exchange, Morgan is to keep quiet about Casey's secret missions, especially to Chuck.

Production
Chuck and Sarah robbing the bank while talking about their wedding parallels their fight in the middle of another bank robbery in "Chuck Versus the First Fight".

Flashes
 Chuck flashes on a room in the bank, identifying the servers as being stolen from the Chinese army one year prior.
 Chuck flashes on acrobatics to jump over a desk and tranquilize several guards.

Music
Songs listed by Alan Sepinwall.
 "El Capitan" by The Steelwells
 "Squealing Pigs" by Admiral Fallow
 "Black Leaf" by The Cave Singers
 "Breeze" by Alex Silverman

Cultural references
 Chuck tells Vivian that he will pose as her bodyguard, saying, "I'll be like your very own Kevin Costner", referencing The Bodyguard.
 Morgan brings his Star Wars bedsheets to his office at the Buy More.
 The episode's bank robbery was presented as an homage to The Matrix.
 While robbing the bank, Chuck refers to Sarah as "Honey Bunny", a reference to the robbery in the opening and closing scenes of Pulp Fiction.
 Morgan tries to cover for his presence in Castle by pretending to make a call about Sector 7-G, which is where Homer Simpson works at the Springfield Nuclear Power Plant on The Simpsons.
 Volkoff's bank card displays the numbers 4, 8, 15, 16, 23, and 42, a recurring plot point from the mythology of  Lost, the series François Chau is known for appearing on.

Reception
"Chuck Versus the First Bank of Evil" received positive reviews from critics. HitFix writer Alan Sepinwall wrote, "After last week's episode impressively balanced a bunch of different storylines for the large ensemble, 'Chuck vs. the First Bank of Evil' was a more streamlined affair, focusing primarily on Vivan's slow transformation from Vivan McArthur to Vivian Volkoff. Unfortunately, Vivian was probably the least compelling part of last week's episode, and the expanded spotlight tonight didn't have me any more convinced that she's going to be a great villain (even if she's a conflicted one) moving forward... Chuck and Sarah robbing the evil bank as a cover for Vivian while talking about the wedding offered up a parallel of sorts of their fight in the middle of another bank robbery in the first Volkoff episode... The bank robbery was such a blatant riff on 'The Matrix' that I'm surprised they missed the opportunity to have Chuck make a joke about it."

Even Steve Heisler of The A.V. Club gave the episode a B, writing that, though the episode was not disjointed and that the "action, particularly the Matrix homage that sent Sarah flying through the air, was well staged and self-aware enough to let itself go over-the-top", it felt "bloated", and the main plot did not blend well with the episode's subplots. Heisler wrote that the episode "was still one of the better recent Chuck episodes (and even though I'm the guy who gave last week's a D, I don't mean that as faint praise)." Eric Goldman of IGN gave this episode a score of 7.5 out of 10, writing that it "felt like a bit of an off week for Chuck – but I do hope we can now continue gathering momentum with Vivian, as Chuck faces off with his evil sister... I mean, if she is his sister."

The episode drew 5.35 million viewers.

References

External links
 

First Bank of Evil
2011 American television episodes